Brooklyn Raines (born March 11, 2005) is a professional soccer player who plays as a midfielder for Major League Soccer club Houston Dynamo. Born in Liberia, he is a youth international for the United States.

Club career
Raines started his soccer career at the age of five when he joined Inter FC Chicago. He left for the Barça Residency Academy at the age of thirteen.

El Paso Locomotive 
In September 2021, Raines signed with USL Championship club El Paso Locomotive.  He made his debut for El Paso on October 17, coming on as a sub in a 5–0 loss to LA Galaxy II.  Raines ended the season with 3 appearances.  El Paso finished the season 2nd in the Western Conference, but Raines did not appear in the playoffs.

Houston Dynamo 
On February 4, 2022, Raines signed with MLS club Houston Dynamo. The Dynamo acquired his homegrown territory rights from Real Salt Lake in exchange for $50,000 of GAM.  Raines made his Dynamo debut on April 19, getting the start and playing 74 minutes in a 2–1 win over Rio Grande Valley FC in a U.S. Open Cup game.  The match saw Raines become the youngest player in Dynamo history at 17 years and 36 days.  On September 4 he made his MLS debut, coming off the bench in a 2–1 loss to the Seattle Sounders.  He ended the season with 4 first team appearances, 3 in the cup and 1 in the league.  Raines primarily played for Houston Dynamo 2 in MLS Next Pro during the 2022 season.

International career
Born in Monrovia, Liberia, Raines has represented the United States at youth international level. Raines looked up to Liberian-American midfielder Darlington Nagbe growing up.

Career statistics

Club

References

2005 births
Living people
Sportspeople from Monrovia
American people of Liberian descent
American soccer players
Liberian footballers
United States men's youth international soccer players
Liberian emigrants to the United States
Association football midfielders
USL Championship players
MLS Next Pro players
Major League Soccer players
El Paso Locomotive FC players
Houston Dynamo FC players
Homegrown Players (MLS)